Peadar Seán Doyle (died 4 August 1956) was an Irish politician. An engineer by profession, his son Seán was killed by British forces at Kilmashogue in the Dublin Mountains on Sunday, 19 September 1920.

Doyle was first elected to Dáil Éireann as a Cumann na nGaedheal Teachta Dála (TD) for the Dublin South constituency at the 1923 general election. He was re-elected at each subsequent general election until his death in 1956.

From 1937 onwards, he was re-elected as a Fine Gael TD and from 1948 he was elected for the Dublin South-West constituency. He served as Lord Mayor of Dublin from 1941 to 1943 and from 1945 to 1946. He was the first Fine Gael Lord Mayor.

References

 

Year of birth missing
1956 deaths
Cumann na nGaedheal TDs
Fine Gael TDs
Lord Mayors of Dublin
Members of the 4th Dáil
Members of the 5th Dáil
Members of the 6th Dáil
Members of the 7th Dáil
Members of the 8th Dáil
Members of the 9th Dáil
Members of the 10th Dáil
Members of the 11th Dáil
Members of the 12th Dáil
Members of the 13th Dáil
Members of the 14th Dáil
Members of the 15th Dáil
Politicians from County Dublin